The ambum stone is an ancient stone sculpture thought to have been carved c. 1500 B.C.E. Other similar stones excavated depict humans, birds, or other animals. This particular stone looks to resemble a fetal echidna.

History
It is not known why the stone was created.  The stone was found by the Enga of Papua New Guinea, and was thought to have ritual significance. It was found in a cave in the early 1960s, and in 1977, was acquired by the National Gallery of Australia. Some suspect that the stone was illegally exported from Papua New Guinea to be able to land in the National Gallery of Australia.

Artifact damaged
In May 2000, the artifact was damaged while it was on loan to the Museum of African Arts, Pacific and Indian. It broke into three main segments: the head, the body, and a chip off the head. Additionally, the artifact incurred several minor "bruises". It was later restored using adhesive and an inpaint to match the finish.

References

Stone sculptures
Arts in Papua New Guinea
Prehistoric art